Lieutenant William Ewart Boulter VC (14 October 1892 – 1 June 1955) was a British Army officer and an English recipient of the Victoria Cross (VC), the highest and most prestigious award for gallantry in the face of the enemy that can be awarded to British and Commonwealth forces.

Boulter was 23 years old, and a sergeant in the 6th Battalion, The Northamptonshire Regiment, British Army during the First World War when the following deed took place for which he was awarded the VC.

On 14 July 1916 at Trones Wood, France, when one company and part of another was held up in the attack on a wood by a hostile machine-gun which was causing heavy casualties, Sergeant Boulter, with utter contempt of danger, and in spite of being wounded in the shoulder, advanced alone over open ground under heavy fire, in front of the gun and bombed the gun team from their position. This act not only saved many casualties, but materially helped the operation of clearing the enemy out of the wood.

He later achieved the rank of lieutenant. He was cremated at Putney Vale Crematorium.

His Victoria Cross is displayed at the Abington Park, Northampton, England.

References

Monuments to Courage (David Harvey, 1999)
The Register of the Victoria Cross (This England, 1997)
VCs of the First World War - The Somme (Gerald Gliddon, 1994)

External links
Wigton Historical Society
Location of grave and VC medal (S.W. London)

1892 births
1955 deaths
People from Wigston Magna
Northamptonshire Regiment soldiers
British Army personnel of World War I
Northamptonshire Regiment officers
British Battle of the Somme recipients of the Victoria Cross
Burials at Putney Vale Cemetery
British Army recipients of the Victoria Cross
Military personnel from Leicestershire